Electrothermal Bipolar Vessel Sealing (EBVS) is an electrosurgery technology for sealing blood vessels of up to 7mm in diameter. The technology was introduced in 1998 and since then has been used widely for a variety of laparoscopic and open surgical procedures.  In addition to sealing blood vessels, modern instruments are designed to grasp and cut a variety of tissues. A number of companies offer EBVS systems including BOWA, Covidien, Conmed, Ethicon Endo-Surgery, Erbe Medical, KLS Martin Group, Olympus and Applied Medical.

Principle of function
A typical Electrothermal Bipolar Vessel Sealing system consists of an electric current generator and an instrument for grasping blood vessels. During surgery, a surgeon first grasps a blood vessel to be sealed with  the instrument that is usually designed as a clamp. A surgeon then initiates a sealing cycle controlled by the generator. The generator produces an electric current across the blood vessel wall. Electromagnetic wave surrounding the current energizes the electrons within the blood vessel. These electrons release their energy as heat. As the blood vessel is heated, the collagen and elastin found in the blood vessel wall denature. The generator precisely controls the amount of energy delivered to the tissue through a computer algorithm that varies depending on the manufacturer. The majority of the generator systems monitor the impedance in the circuit and as it begins to rise automatically break the current. This prevents charring and burning of the vessel wall. The sealing cycle is complete with a period of cool-down during which the elastin and collagen form a seal. Some of the EBVS instruments are also able to cut the formed seal either with a blade incorporated into jaws of the instrument or with a harmonic scalpel technology.

History
The EBVS systems are a modification of the bipolar electrosurgical technology developed in the 1940s. This technology could not be used to reliably seal blood vessels larger than 3mm in diameter.
In 1984 a team of neurosurgeons from Sweden introduced a modification to the traditional bipolar generator system to reduce the inadvertent burning and charring often produced by these systems. This was accomplished by incorporating a computer algorithm monitoring the impedance between the jaws of the instruments in real time. However, this system still could not reliably seal blood vessels larger than 3mm in diameter. Modifying this technology, researchers from Covidien patented the first EBVS system in 1998. Using a computer algorithm to monitor the impedance and an instrument designed as clamp, this first EBVS system allowed for blood vessel of up to 7mm to be sealed. Since then a number of modifications have been made to the original computer algorithm and several companies have also developed their own EBVS systems.

See also
Instruments used in general surgery
Na effect

References

EL-Erian AM, EL-Azeem E. Skin sparing mastectomy made easy with the use of LigaSure ImpactTm and tumescent local anaesthesia: towards technical standardization. Med J Cairo Univ. 2013;81:85–95.
Google scholarhttps://scholar.google.com/citations?user=oX90OUQAAAAJ

Electrosurgery
Surgical instruments